Tales of the Third Dimension is a 1984 3D comedy horror anthology film  starring Robert Bloodworth, Kevin Campbell and William T. Hicks. It comprises three tales directed by Worth Keeter, Thom McIntyre, and Todd Durham. They are introduced by skeleton host 'Igor' in wraparound sequences directed by Earl Owensby.

References

External links
 

1984 3D films
1980s comedy horror films
1984 comedy films
1984 horror films
Films directed by Worth Keeter
1980s English-language films